Schwarze Sonne may refer to:
 Schwarze Sonne (book)
 "Schwarze Sonne" (song), a 2003 song by E Nomine from Die Prophezeiung
 Schwarze Sonne, a Nazi moonbase in the film Iron Sky
 The black sun or sonnerad, a sun wheel symbol of neonazis

See also
Black Sun (disambiguation)